The Men's 1500 metre freestyle competition at the 2022 World Aquatics Championships was held on 24 and 25 June 2022.

Records
Prior to the competition, the existing world and championship records were as follows.

The following new records were set during this competition.

Results

Heats
The heats were started on 24 June at 10:11.

Final
The final was held on 25 June at 18:17.

References

Men's 1500 metre freestyle